Galiano may refer to:

Galiano Island, an island of British Columbia, Canada
Galiano (surname)
HMCS Galiano, a Royal Canadian Navy patrol vessel
Galiano (Luzon), a former small town at a powerplant between Mount Lomboy and Mount Bilbil, on Luzon island, Philippines, that was site of World War II fighting

See also
Galliano (disambiguation)
Gagliano (disambiguation)
Galeano (disambiguation)